The 1989 Soviet Cup Final was a football match that took place at the Lenin's Central Stadium, Moscow on June 25, 1989. The match was the 48th Soviet Cup Final and it was contested by FC Dnipro Dnipropetrovsk and FC Torpedo Moscow. The Soviet Cup winner Dnipro qualified for the Champions Cup for winning the champion's title, while the finalist Torpedo was allowed to compete at the Cup Winners' Cup first round for the Soviet Union. The last year defending champions Metalist Kharkiv were eliminated in the second round of the competition by FC Torpedo Moscow (1:1, 1:2). For Dnipro this was their first final. For Torpedo it was their 14th Cup Final and the eighth loss at this stage.

Road to Moscow 

All sixteen Soviet Top League clubs did not have to go through qualification to get into the competition, so Dnepr and Torpedo both qualified for the competition automatically.

Previous Encounters 
Previously they only met seven times with Torpedo winning four and Dnipro 3, the goals were 7 to 5 respectively. The very first time they met each other on March 12, 1972, at the Round of 16 when Torpedo playing home was victorious 2:0. The last encounter was during the last season when in the semifinals Torpedo once again defeated Dnipro in overtime playing at home.

Match details

See also
 Soviet Top League 1988

References

External links 
Torpedo Moscow unofficial website
Report 
The competition calendar 

1989
Cup
Soviet Cup Final 1989
Soviet Cup Final 1989
June 1989 sports events in Europe
1989 in Moscow